Dean Barker is the name of:
Dean Barker (speedway rider) (born 1970), former British international speedway rider
Dean Barker (yachtsman) (born 1972), New Zealand America's Cup competitor